WMGJ (1240 AM, "Magic 1240 AM") is a radio station licensed to serve Gadsden, Alabama, United States.  The station is owned by Floyd L. Donald Broadcasting Co., Inc. Operations Manager is David Lawson.

Programming
WMGJ broadcasts a community-oriented urban contemporary music format to the Etowah County, Alabama, area.  The station describes its program offerings as a blend of a local talk radio, gospel, rhythm and blues, urban contemporary chart toppers, news, and local sports coverage.  Notable local weekday air talent includes Floyd L. Donald, Marinda Davis-Reaves, and Bill Morrow.

History
This station received its original construction permit from the Federal Communications Commission on September 10, 1984.  The new station was assigned the call letters WMGJ by the FCC on September 25, 1984.  WMGJ received its license to cover from the FCC on March 21, 1986.

References

External links
WMGJ official website

MGJ
Urban contemporary radio stations in the United States
Etowah County, Alabama
Radio stations established in 1985
1985 establishments in Alabama